Michał Stasiak (born 12 March 1981 in Zduńska Wola) is a Polish professional footballer who plays for Flota Świnoujście as a defender.

Career

Club
In January 2004, he joined Dyskobolia Grodzisk Wielkopolski.

He was released from Zagłębie Lubin on 25 May 2011.

In July 2011, he joined Skoda Xanthi in the Superleague Greece.

National team
Stasiak has made three appearances for the Poland national football team.

References

External links
 
 
 Michał Stasiak at Soccerway

1981 births
Living people
People from Zduńska Wola
Polish footballers
Poland international footballers
Polish expatriate footballers
Zagłębie Lubin players
Odra Wodzisław Śląski players
Amica Wronki players
Dyskobolia Grodzisk Wielkopolski players
Widzew Łódź players
Xanthi F.C. players
Flota Świnoujście players
GKS Tychy players
Miedź Legnica players
Bytovia Bytów players
Ekstraklasa players
III liga players
IV liga players
Super League Greece players
Expatriate footballers in Greece
Sportspeople from Łódź Voivodeship
Association football defenders